Wilson Bell (May 24, 1897 – May 20, 1947) was an American politician. He served as the State Treasurer of Missouri from 1941 to 1945, and as Secretary of State of Missouri from 1945 to 1947.

References

State treasurers of Missouri
Secretaries of State of Missouri
Missouri Democrats
Deaths from kidney cancer
1897 births
1947 deaths
20th-century American politicians
Deaths from cancer in Missouri